Where Your Eyes Linger is a 2020 South Korean web series starring Han Gi-chan, Jang Eui-soo, Choi Kyu-ri and Jeon Jae-young. Two episodes were released each Friday at noon from May 22 to June 12, 2020, on the W-STORY app in South Korea and on the video streaming website Viki in over 200 countries.

The director's cut was originally set to be released in theaters in June 2020, but was eventually released online through the streaming platforms Netflix, Wavve, TVING and Naver TV on July 16, 2020.

Synopsis
Han Tae-joo, the heir of TB Group, is under the protection of Kang-gook who has been his best friend for fifteen years. The two share a master-servant relationship, with Kang-gook acting as Han Tae-joo's bodyguard. As they grow up, Kang-gook slowly realizes that he likes Han Tae-joo as more than friends, but realises that he has to keep it to himself. He cannot take his eyes off of Han Tae-joo, but neither can he get as close to him as he wants. Han Tae-joo, on the other hand, is a player who has had several girlfriends in the past, and who is confident and assertive. He knows all of Kang Gook's weaknesses, and enjoys pressing his buttons. The two friends share an unnaturally close friendship, often blurring the lines between friends and something more. Kang Gook often looks at Han Tae-joo with lingering looks of longing, and they share many charged moments of unresolved sexual tension. This state of affairs changes when Choi Hye-mi, a new female student, joins their high school and shows interest in Kang-gook. Han Tae-joo is forced to confront his feelings for Kang Gook. Throughout the story, Kang Gook tries to keep Han Tae-joo at arm's length. This leads to several occasions where Han Tae-joo, who is having none of it, pushes Kang Gook's boundaries.

Cast

Main
 Han Gi-chan as Han Tae-joo
 Jang Eui-soo as Kang-gook
 Choi Kyu-ri as Choi Hye-mi
 Jeon Jae-young as Kim Pil-hyun

Supporting
 Jung Seo-in as Hye-mi's mother
 Cheon Seung-ho as Pil-hyun's friend

Original soundtrack
The soundtrack for the series was released by Music&New on June 5, 2020.

Episodes

International release
 In Japan, the series was released weekly on Rakuten TV.
 In Taiwan, the series was released weekly on Line TV.
 In Thailand and the Philippines, the series was released weekly on Tencent Video.

References

External links
Official website
 
 

South Korean drama web series
2020 web series debuts
2020 web series endings
South Korean LGBT-related television shows
Viki (streaming service) original programming
2020s LGBT-related drama television series
South Korean boys' love television series